Dead Sleep is a 1990 Australian horror film about a series of suspicious deaths that occur in a psychiatric ward. The cast includes Linda Blair, veteran Australian actor Tony Bonner and Vassy Costiopoulos. The film went straight to video.

Plot synopsis
Based on actual events, Maggie Healy (Linda Blair) works at a mental hospital and learns the grisly truth about Dr. Jonathan Heckett (Tony Bonner) who performs suspicious operations on comatose patients.

Cast
Linda Blair as Maggie Healey
Tony Bonner as Dr. Jonathan Heckett
Andrew Booth as Hugh Clayton
Christine Amor as Sister Kereby
Sueyan Cox as Kaye
Brian Moll as Dr. Shamberg
Vassy Cotsopoulos as Thena Fuery
Craig Cronin as Dr. Harry Lark
Peta Downes as Jessica Sharp
Suzie MacKenzie as Wendy
Russell Krause as Orderly

References

External links

Dead Sleep on Rotten Tomatoes
Dead Sleep at Oz Movies

1992 films
1992 horror films
Australian horror films
Films about medical malpractice
Films set in psychiatric hospitals
Films scored by Brian May (composer)
Australian thriller films
1990s English-language films
1990s Australian films